This is a list of Elon Phoenix football players in the NFL Draft.

Key

Selections

References

Elon

Elon Phoenix NFL Draft